Enzo Miccio (born 5 May 1971) is an Italian television presenter, known for his work on Wedding Planners.

Biography

Television
Wedding Planners (2005–2014), Real Time
Ma come ti vesti? (2009–2018), with Carla Gozzi, Real Time (Italian version of What Not to Wear)
Shopping Night (2011–2015, 2019), with Carla Gozzi, Real Time
Mettiamoci all'opera (2011–2012), Rai 1
L'eleganza del maschio (2013), Real Time
Enzo Missione Spose (2014–present), Real Time

Radio 
From 2011 Good Morning Kiss Kiss, Radio Kiss Kiss

Books 

(with Carla Gozzi)

References

External links
Realtime Italy

Living people
1971 births
Italian television presenters